Titanic Quarter railway station (sometimes still referred to as Bridge End) is located in the townland of Ballymacarrett in east Belfast. It is a short walk from the SSE Arena and Titanic Quarter.

History
Bridge End (as it was known when it opened on Monday 9 May 1977) replaced the nearby Ballymacarrett station (opened 1 May 1905 and closed on Monday 9 May 1977). The platforms of this station can still be seen from passing trains, as can the platforms for Victoria Park, another station before Sydenham which closed in the late 1980s.

Bridge End station was officially renamed "Titanic Quarter" in March 2012 to coincide with the opening of developments in the nearby Titanic Quarter area. In addition, there is planned work which will include improvements to pedestrian and cycle access and new signage from the rail halt into the Quarter.

Service
Extra services operate at peak times, and the service reduces to hourly operation in the evenings.

On Sundays there is an hourly service in each direction.

References

Railway stations in Belfast
Railway stations opened in 1977
Railway stations served by NI Railways
Railway stations in County Down
Railway stations opened by NI Railways
Railway stations in Northern Ireland opened in the 20th century